Melanie Mie Bak (born 30 January 1994) is a Danish handball player who plays for SCM Craiova and the Danish national team.

She made her debut on the Danish national team on 28 September 2018, against Norway in a friendly match.

Achievements 
Slovenian Championship
Winner: 2014
Slovenian Cup
Winner: 2014

Individual awards  
 Topscorer of Eliteserien: 2017/2018 (143 goals)

References

1994 births
Living people
Danish female handball players
People from Skanderborg Municipality
Viborg HK players
Sportspeople from the Central Denmark Region